Michael J. Brennan (born November 14, 1942) is emeritus professor of finance at the UCLA Anderson School of Management. Brennan co-designed the Brennan-Schwartz interest rate model and was a pioneer of real options theory. His writings on real options and asset pricing, corporate finance, derivative securities, market microstructure, the role of information in capital markets, and risk management have been published extensively.

He is a former president of the American Finance Association, and has served as editor of the Journal of Finance and was the founding editor of the Review of Financial Studies; the Michael Brennan Award is named for him. He was a founding partner and director of the Real Options Group since its inception. He has served as consultant to businesses and governments in the USA and Canada. He was previously a professor at the London Business School.

Professor Brennan holds a B.Phil. in Economics (1964) from Oxford University, an MBA (1967) from the University of Pittsburgh and a Ph.D. in Business (1970) from the MIT Sloan School of Management.

On May 22, 2011, Brennan was awarded an honorary Doctor of Laws from the University of Notre Dame.

Selected publications
Brennan, M.J., The Role of Learning in Dynamic Portfolio Decisions, European Finance Review, 1, 295-306 (1998).
Brennan, M.J. and Torous, W.N., Individual Decision Making and Investor Welfare, Economic Notes, 28, 2, 119-143 (July 1999).
Brennan, M.J., Chordia, T. and Subrahmanyam, A., Alternative Factor Specifications, Security Characteristics, and the Cross-Section of Expected Stock Returns, Journal of Financial Economics, 49, 3, 345-373 (September 1998).
Brennan, M.J. and Franks, J.R., Underpricing, Ownership and Control in Initial Public Offerings of Equity Securities in the UK, Journal of Financial Economics, 45, 391-413 (September 1997).

References

External links
Profile, UCLA
Profile, Real Options Group
SSRN Author Page

Living people
MIT Sloan School of Management alumni
Alumni of the University of Oxford
UCLA Anderson School of Management faculty
Financial economists
Real options
Corporate finance theorists
Place of birth missing (living people)
1942 births
21st-century American economists
Presidents of the American Finance Association
The Review of Financial Studies editors